Rick Walters may refer to:

 Slick Rick (born 1965), British-American rapper
 Rick Walters (Canadian football) (born 1971), slotback in the Canadian Football League
 Rick Walters (tattoo artist) (born 1945), American tattoo artist